Odontophrynus cultripes (common nane: Rio Grande escuerzo) is a species of frog in the family Odontophrynidae. It is endemic to southeastern Brazil and known from Minas Gerais, Goiás, and São Paulo states.

Description
Males measure  and females  in snout–vent length. The snout is vertical in profile. The parotoid glands are large and ovoid. Dorsal ground colour is greyish green. The male advertisement call is composed of a single, multi-pulsed note.

Habitat and conservation
Odontophrynus cultripes is a fossorial species that occurs in open areas, forest edges, and suburban gardens. It is an abundant species that breeds explosively in temporary pools, including man-made ones. Although not threatened, habitat loss caused by infrastructure development and agricultural activities can negatively impact the species.

References

cultripes
Endemic fauna of Brazil
Amphibians of Brazil
Taxa named by Christian Frederik Lütken
Taxa named by Johannes Theodor Reinhardt
Amphibians described in 1862
Taxonomy articles created by Polbot